Belvoir Park Forest is a large forest in Belfast, Northern Ireland. Owned and managed by Forest Service, it was opened in 1961 and covers 75 hectares along the bank of the River Lagan.

Archaeological sites within the forest include the remains of a 12th century Norman motte. Wildlife recorded within the park boundaries includes Large Bracket Fungi, Toothwort (lathraea squamaria; L.), Giant Hog-weed (heracleum mantegazzianum;  Somm. & Levier), long-eared owls, kingfishers, and long-tailed tits. Badgers and red foxes are also recorded.

References

Forests and woodlands of Northern Ireland
Geography of Belfast